The following are lists of Florida Gators basketball players:

 List of Florida Gators women's basketball players in the WNBA
 List of Florida Gators in the NBA